Shin Seung-hwan  is a South Korean actor.

Filmography

Film

Television series

Web series

Television show

Web shows

References

External links

 
Shin Seung-hwan at Daum 
Shin Seung-hwan at Naver 

South Korean male film actors
South Korean male television actors
South Korean male stage actors
People from Busan
Living people
Seoul Institute of the Arts alumni
20th-century South Korean male actors
21st-century South Korean male actors
South Korean television personalities
1978 births